Puerto Rico competed at the 1992 Summer Paralympics in Barcelona, Spain. 9 competitors from Puerto Rico won no medals and so did not place in the medal table.

See also 
 Puerto Rico at the Paralympics
 Puerto Rico at the 1992 Summer Olympics

References 

Puerto Rico at the Paralympics
Nations at the 1992 Summer Paralympics
Para